Scopula derasata is a moth of the family Geometridae. It is endemic to South Africa.

Taxonomy
This species is possibly only an aberration of Scopula minorata described by Jean Baptiste Boisduval in 1833.

References

Endemic moths of South Africa
Moths described in 1863
derasata
Taxa named by Francis Walker (entomologist)